Dr. Manu Baligar (Kannada: Manu Baḷigār) is an Indian Kannada writer, author, playwright, former civil servant and the current president of Kannada Sahitya Parishat. He hails from Shigli in Gadag district, and is the elder brother of V. P. Baligar, a retired Indian Administrative Service officer and former chairman of Housing and Urban Development Corporation. He was a civil servant in the Karnataka Administrative Service, and retired as the commissioner of Department of Kannada and Culture, Government of Karnataka. He was elected the president of the Kannada Sahitya Parishat, an apex body for the promotion of Kannada language, on 3 March 2016 for a term of three years which was later legally extended to five years.  He has been conferred with many coveted honors including the highly prestigious Nadoja Award by the Hampi University in 2019  and also an honorary doctorate for literature from Karnataka University Dharwad. Also, he has been conferred with two gold medals for his exemplary work on IRDP  during his career as a civil servant.

Works 
Manu Baligar has been known for his rich contributions to both literature and bureaucracy simultaneously. He has authored over 30 books including five story compilations, six anthologies and four biographies. He also happens to be the only bureaucrat to receive an honorary doctorate from Karnataka University for contributing to Kannada literature. Some of his famous works include Belaka Bedagu - compilation of his columns in Prajavani daily, Mylara Mahadeva - a play on the life of a legendary martyr, and a biography of former chief minister of Karnataka, S. R. Kanthi. He has successfully organized and convened numerous international and national conferences on Kannada Literature including the world renowned Vishwa Kannada Sammelana held at Belagavi in 2011. He has delivered innumerable keynote lectures on Kannada literature in international literary conferences held at countries like UK, America, Australia, Nepal and Singapore. The progress and achievements of the Kannada Sahitya Parishat under his able leadership and presidency has been recorded and presented in the form of books Kaayaka Patha (ಕಾಯಕಪಥ) (progress during the period 03/03/2016 to 31/10/2017) and Kaayaka Nirata (ಕಾಯಕನಿರತ) (progress during the period 01/11/2017 to 05/10/2019) at the Parishat website.

Awards and honours 

 Nadoja Award (2019)
 Lingaraja Desai Award
 Ranna Sahitya Award
 Goruru Sahitya Award
 Vishwamanava Award (2008)
 Kempegowda Sahitya Award

List of works 
His works have been translated to English and many other Indian languages like Oriya, Telugu and Hindi. Many of his works have been used as textbooks in schools and universities. Some of his works are listed below.

Story compilations 

 Avyaktha (1983)
 Runa (1998)
 Baduku Mayeya Maata (2002)
 The Debt and other Stories (2004)
 Kelavu Kathegalu (2005)

Poetry 

 Nanna Ninnaolage (1983)
 Yeddavaru Biddavaru (1994)
 Saakshara Geethegalu (1994) 
 Niagara Mattu Jalapathagalu (1998)
 Kavi Raveendrara Minchina Hanigalu (2004)
 Aayda Kavanagalu (2011)

Essays and short stories 

 Yekantha Mattu Yekagrathe (2004)
 Belaka Bedagu (2009)
 Samskruthi Vihaara (2012)

Plays 

 Mylaara Mahadeva (2007)

Biographies 

 Appa (2002)
 Ati Virala Raajakarani S.R. Kanthi (2001)
 Abdul Nazeer Saab (2005)

References

External links
Want to put Kannada literature on the global map: Baligar

Living people
Writers from Karnataka
Kannada-language writers
People from Gadag district
Indian male writers
Year of birth missing (living people)